Michael Andrés Silva Torres (born 12 March 1988) is a Chilean footballer who currently plays for Deportes Melipilla as a forward.

Club career
As a child he was with Unión Placilla, the club of his neighborhood in Valparaíso. A product of Santiago Wanderers youth system, in 2007 he signed with Mexican side Atlante, being loaned to León, Provincial Osorno, Potros Chetumal and Cobreloa.

Back in Chile, he returned to Santiago Wanderers and next he has played for several clubs, mainly at the Primera B.

International career
He represented Chile at under-20 level in the 2007 FIFA World Cup, where he made two appearances. In addition, he represented Chile in the 2009 Toulon Tournament, where Chile was the champion.

Honours
Chile U20
 FIFA U-20 World Cup Third place: 2007

Chile U21
 Toulon Tournament: 2009

References

External links
 
 
 Michael Silva at PlaymakerStats

1988 births
Living people
Sportspeople from Valparaíso
Chilean footballers
Chilean expatriate footballers
Chile under-20 international footballers
Santiago Wanderers footballers
Atlante F.C. footballers
Club León footballers
Provincial Osorno footballers
Cobreloa footballers
C.D. Antofagasta footballers
Unión La Calera footballers
San Marcos de Arica footballers
Ñublense footballers
Deportes La Serena footballers
Rangers de Talca footballers
Deportes Iquique footballers
Deportes Melipilla footballers
Chilean Primera División players
Ascenso MX players
Primera B de Chile players
Chilean expatriate sportspeople in Mexico
Expatriate footballers in Mexico
Association football forwards